KREJ (101.7 FM) is a Christian radio station licensed to Medicine Lodge, Kansas, United States. The station is owned by Florida Public Radio, Inc.

KREJ's programming includes Christian Talk and Teaching programs including; Revive our Hearts with Nancy DeMoss Wolgemuth, Turning Point with David Jeremiah, Focus On The Family, Unshackled!, Enjoying Everyday Life with Joyce Meyer, and Love Worth Finding with Adrian Rogers, along with Christian music.

Translators
KREJ is also heard on a low powered translator on 97.1 in Woodward, Oklahoma.

KREJ was also formerly heard on full powered station 90.3 KNJT in Coldwater, Kansas, until Florida Public Radio surrendered KNJT's license to the Federal Communications Commission on January 8, 2023, and it was cancelled.

References

External links
KREJ's official website

REJ
Radio stations established in 1989